House of America is a 1997 British film directed by Marc Evans. The film, set in a depressed Welsh mining town, centres on a dysfunctional family unit of brothers Boyo and Sid, their sister Gwenny and their controlling mother. The film tackles issues such as Welsh identity, its need for indigenous heroes and the nation's perceived inferiority complex.

The film was the theatrical debut for director Marc Evans, and the film won him the 'Best Directorial Debut' award at the Stockholm International Film Festival. The film also took four awards at the 1998 BAFTA Cymru awards.

It is a part of the cultural era known as Cool Cymru along with other similar independent films of the time.

Cast
 Siân Phillips as Mam
 Matthew Rhys as Boyo
 Steven Mackintosh as Sid
 Lisa Palfrey as Gwenny
 Steve Speirs as The Head
 Richard Harrington as Cat

Notes

External links
 
 

1997 films
Films set in Wales
British independent films
1997 drama films
Films directed by Marc Evans
Films shot in Wales
Films scored by John Cale
British drama films
Cool Cymru
1990s English-language films
1990s British films